Sheila Gish (born Sheila Anne Syme Gash; 23 April 1942 – 9 March 2005) was an English actress. For her role in the 1995 London revival of the Stephen Sondheim musical Company, she won the Olivier Award for Best Supporting Performance in a Musical.

Her film appearances included an A Day in the Death of Joe Egg (1972), Quartet (1981), Highlander (1986) and Mansfield Park (1999) On television, she starred in the 1969 BBC series The First Churchills, the 1992 TV miniseries of Danielle Steel's Jewels and the short-lived ITV sitcom Brighton Belles (1993–94).

Personal life
She was born in Lincoln, Lincolnshire, studied at the Royal Academy of Dramatic Art (RADA), and made her stage debut with a repertory company. She had two daughters: the actresses Lou Gish and Kay (Katharine Ghislaine S. A.) Curram (born 1974) by her first husband, the actor Roland Curram. While filming That Uncertain Feeling for BBC2 in 1985, she met actor Denis Lawson, who was to become her second husband.

Career
Her first starring role in the West End was as Bella in Robert and Elizabeth. She continued to be best known for her stage work. In 1996, Gish played the role of Joanne in Stephen Sondheim's Company at the Donmar Warehouse directed by Sam Mendes. Gish received the Olivier Award for Best Supporting Role in a Musical for her performance. In 1999 she played Mrs Venable in Tennessee Williams's Suddenly Last Summer, directed by Sean Mathias with Rachel Weisz at the Comedy Theatre, London. One of her last stage roles was as Arkadina in the Chichester Festival Theatre's production of The Seagull in 2003.

Gish also appeared in many television dramas, from The First Churchills (in which she played Mary of Modena) to the successful adaptation of Love in a Cold Climate (2001) in which she played the eccentric and outrageous Lady Montdore. She also appeared in an episode of The Sweeney in 1975 as June Boyse, a villain's wife, and "A Harmless Vanity", a Tales of the Unexpected episode playing a suspicious housewife.

Gish occasionally appeared in films, her most notable performances being in A Day in the Death of Joe Egg (1972), Hitler: The Last Ten Days (1973), the Merchant Ivory film Quartet (1981), Merisairas (1996), and as Mrs Norris in Jane Austen's Mansfield Park (1999). She is also known for her appearance as Rachel Ellenstein in the 1986 film Highlander and its 2000 sequel Highlander: Endgame.

Death

In 2003, she lost her right eye to skin cancer. She died of cancer in 2005 in Camden, London, at the age of 62.

Partial filmography

References

External links

Guardian obituary

1942 births
2005 deaths
Alumni of RADA
Deaths from skin cancer
English film actresses
Laurence Olivier Award winners
Burials at Highgate Cemetery
Deaths from cancer in England
People from Lincoln, England
People educated at the Royal School for Daughters of Officers of the Army
English television actresses
20th-century English actresses
21st-century English actresses
English people of Australian descent
Actresses from Lincolnshire